Wichita Falls is a city in and the seat of government of Wichita County, Texas, United States. It is the principal city of the Wichita Falls Metropolitan Statistical Area, which encompasses all of Archer, Clay, and Wichita counties. According to the 2010 census, it had a population of 104,553, making it the 38th-most populous city in Texas. In addition, its central business district is 5 miles (8 km) from Sheppard Air Force Base, which is home to the Air Force's largest technical training wing and the Euro-NATO Joint Jet Pilot Training program, the world's only multinationally staffed and managed flying training program chartered to produce combat pilots for both USAF and NATO.

The city is home to the Newby-McMahon Building (otherwise known as the "world's littlest skyscraper"), constructed downtown in 1919 and featured in Robert Ripley's Ripley's Believe It or Not!.

History

The Choctaw Native Americans settled the area in the early 1800s from their native Mississippi area once Americans displaced them after the Treaty of Dancing Rabbit Creek. The treaty was signed and proclaimed in 1830-1831. As late as 1841, a large Indian settlement was present in the area that is now the city of Wichita Falls.

American settlers arrived in the 1860s, mainly as cattle ranchers. The city was named Wichita Falls on September 27, 1876, as the Wichita River runs through the area and there was a waterfall in the river’s course in 1876. Just ten years later in 1886, a flood destroyed the original waterfall on the Wichita River for which the city was named. After nearly 100 years of visitors wanting to visit the no longer existing falls, the city built an artificial waterfall beside the river in Lucy Park. They are visible to south-bound traffic on Interstate 44.

On the day the city was named in 1876, a sale of town lots was held at what is now the corner of Seventh and Ohio Streets – the birthplace of the city. The Fort Worth & Denver City Railway arrived in September 1882, the same year the city became the county seat of Wichita County. The city grew westwards from the original FW&DC train depot which was located at the northwest corner of Seventh Street and the FW&DC. This area is now referred to as the Depot Square Historic District, which has been declared a Texas Historic Landmark.

The early history of Wichita Falls well into the 20th century also rests on the work of two entrepreneurs, Joseph A. Kemp and his brother-in-law, Frank Kell. Kemp and Kell were pioneers in food processing and retailing, flour milling, railroads, cattle, banking, and oil.

Downtown Wichita Falls was the city's main shopping area for many years. Those shops lost ground to the creation of new shopping centers throughout the city beginning with Parker Square in 1953 and other similar developments during the 1960s and 1970s, culminating with the opening of Sikes Senter Mall in 1974. The city has been seeking funding to rebuild and restore the downtown area since 2010.

Wichita Falls was once home to offices of several oil companies and related industries, along with oil refineries operated by the Continental Oil Company (now ConocoPhillips) until 1952 and Panhandle Oil Company American Petrofina until 1965. Both firms continued to use a portion of their former refineries as gasoline/oil terminal facilities for many years.

1964 tornado
A devastating tornado hit the north and northwest portions of Wichita Falls along with Sheppard Air Force Base during the afternoon of April 3, 1964 (later referred to as "Black Friday"). As the first violent tornado on record to hit the Wichita Falls area, it left seven dead and more than 100 injured. Additionally, the tornado caused roughly $15 million in property damage with about 225 homes destroyed and another 250 damaged. It was rated F5, the highest rating on the Fujita scale, but it is overshadowed by the 1979 tornado.

1979 tornado

An F4 tornado struck the heavily populated southern sections of Wichita Falls in the late afternoon on Tuesday, April 10, 1979 (known as "Terrible Tuesday"). It was part of an outbreak that produced 30 tornadoes around the region. Despite having nearly an hour's advance warning that severe weather was imminent, 42 people were killed (including 25 in vehicles) and 1,800 were injured because it arrived just as many people were driving home from work. It left 20,000 people homeless and caused $400 million in damage, a U.S. record not topped by an individual tornado until the F5 Moore–Oklahoma City tornado of May 3, 1999.

Geography and climate

Wichita Falls experiences a humid subtropical climate (Köppen climate classification Cfa), featuring long, very hot and humid summers, and cool winters. The city has some of the highest summer daily maximum temperatures in the entire U.S. outside of the Desert Southwest. However, 59 to 60 nights of freezing lows occur, and an average of 4.8 days where the high does not rise above freezing.

From 2010 through 2013 Wichita Falls, along with a large portion of the south-central US, experienced a persistent drought. On every day from June 22 to August 12, the temperature reached 100 °F or higher, and from May 27 to September 3, the temperature reached 90 °F or higher.

During the 2015 Texas–Oklahoma floods, Wichita Falls broke its all-time record for the wettest month, with 17.00 inches of rain recorded in May 2015.

Notes:

Demographics

2020 census

As of the 2020 United States census, there were 102,316 people, 37,297 households, and 23,087 families residing in the city.

2000 census
As of the census of 2000, 104,197 people, 37,970 households, and 24,984 families resided in the city. The 41,916 housing units averaged . The racial makeup of the city was 75.1% White, 12.4% African American, 0.9% Native American, 2.2% Asian, 0.1% Pacific Islander, 6.4% from other races, and 3.0% from two or more races. Hispanics or Latinos of any race were 14.0% of the population.

Of the 37,970 households, 33.1% had children under the age of 18 living with them, 49.7% were married couples living together, 12.3% had a female householder with no husband present, and 34.2% were not families. About 28.7% of all households were made up of individuals, and 10.7% had someone living alone who was 65 years of age or older. The average household size was 2.46, and the average family size was 3.04.

In the city, the population was distributed as 24.7% under the age of 18, 15.2% from 18 to 24, 29.3% from 25 to 44, 18.6% from 45 to 64, and 12.3% who were 65 years of age or older. The median age was 39 years. For every 100 females, there were 106.2 males. For every 100 females age 18 and over, there were 106.7 males.

The median income for a household in the city was $32,554, and for a family was $39,911. Males had a median income of $27,609 versus $21,877 for females. The per capita income for the city was $16,761. About 10.8% of families and 13.9% of the population were below the poverty line, including 17.7% of those under age 18 and 10.3% of those age 65 or over.

Economy

Top employers
According to Wichita Falls Chamber of Commerce, the top employers in the city are:

Media

Wichita Falls is part of a bi-state media market that also includes the nearby, smaller city of Lawton, Oklahoma. According to Nielsen Media Research estimates for the 2016–17 season, the market – which encompasses ten counties in western north Texas and six counties in southwestern Oklahoma, has 152,950 households with at least one television set, making it the 148th-largest television market in the United States; the market also has an average of 120,200 radio listeners ages 12 and over, making it the 250th largest radio market in the nation.

Newspapers
 Times Record News (daily)
 Falls News Journal (daily)

Television stations
 KFDX-TV (channel 3; NBC)
 KAUZ-TV (channel 6; CBS, and digital subchannel 6.2; The CW)
 KSWO-TV (channel 7; ABC, and digital subchannel 7.2; Telemundo)
 KJTL (channel 18; Fox)
 KJBO-LD (channel 35; MyNetworkTV)

KERA-TV out of Dallas–Fort Worth serves as the default PBS member station for Wichita Falls via a translator station on UHF channel 44.

Radio stations
 KWFS (1290 AM; news/talk radio)
 KMCU (88.7 FM; National Public Radio)
 KMOC (89.5 FM; Contemporary Christian)
 KZKL (90.5 FM; Contemporary Christian)
 KNIN (92.9 FM; CHR)
 KOLI (94.9 FM; Modern Country)
 KTWF (95.5 FM; Classic hits)
 KXXN (97.5 FM; Classic Country)
 KLUR (99.9 FM; Country)
 KWFB (100.9 FM; Adult hits)
 KWFS-FM (102.3 FM; Modern Country)
 KQXC (103.9 FM; Rhythmic CHR)
 KYYI (104.7 FM; Classic rock)
 KBZS (106.3 FM; Active rock)

Sports and recreation

Recreation

Lake Wichita

Lucy Park 
Lucy Park is a  park with a log cabin, duck pond, swimming pool, playground, frisbee golf course, and picnic areas. It has multiple paved walkways suitable for walking, running, biking, or rollerskating, including a river walk that goes to a recreation of the original falls for which the city was named (the original falls were destroyed in a 19th-century flood; the new falls were built in response to numerous tourist requests to visit the "Wichita Falls"). It is one of 37 parks throughout the city. The parks range in size from small neighborhood facilities to the 258 acres of Weeks Park featuring the Champions Course at Weeks Park, an 18-hole golf course. In addition, an off-leash dog park is within Lake Wichita Park and a skatepark adjacent to the city's softball complex. Also, unpaved trails for off-road biking and hiking are available.

Hotter'N Hell Hundred 
Wichita Falls is the home of the annual Hotter'N Hell Hundred, the largest single day century bicycle ride in the United States and one of the largest races in the world. The race started as a way for the city to celebrate its centennial in 1982. The race takes place over a weekend in August, and there are multiple events for people to participate in.

Sports 
In 2014, the Wichita Falls Nighthawks, an indoor football team, joined the Indoor Football League but suspended operations after the 2017 season.

The city has also been home to a number of semi-professional, developmental, and minor league sports teams, including the Wichita Falls Drillers, a semi-pro football team that has won numerous league titles and a national championship; Wichita Falls Kings (formerly known as Wichita Falls Razorbacks), the professional basketball team Wichita Falls Texans of the Continental Basketball Association; Wichita Falls Fever in the Lone Star Soccer Alliance (1989–92); the Wichita Falls Spudders baseball team in the Texas League; the Wichita Falls Wildcats (formerly the Wichita Falls Rustlers) of the North American Hockey League, an American Tier II junior hockey league; and the Wichita Falls Roughnecks (formerly the Graham Roughnecks) of the Texas Collegiate League. The Dallas Cowboys held training camp in Wichita Falls during the late 1990s. However, the sustainability of minor or rookie league sports franchises in the Wichita Falls region have a questionable future.

The Professional Wrestling Hall of Fame relocated to Wichita Falls from Amsterdam, New York, in November 2015.

Government

Local government
The mayor of Wichita Falls is Stephen Santellana, who was elected in 2016 and reelected in 2018. Mayors are elected on a nonpartisan ballot.

The Wichita Falls City Council has six members, as follows. 
 District 1: Michael Smith
 District 2: DeAndra Chenault
 District 3: Jeff Browning
 District 4: Tim Brewer
 District 5: Steve Jackson
 At-Large: Bobby Whiteley

The city manager is Darron Leiker.

State and federal politics
Wichita Falls is located in the 69th district of the Texas House of Representatives. Lanham Lyne, a Republican, represented the district from 2011 to 2013; he was the mayor of Wichita Falls from 2005 to 2010. When Lyne declined to seek a second term in 2012, voters chose another Republican, James Frank. Wichita Falls is located in the 30th district of the Texas Senate. Craig Estes, a Republican, had held the senate seat since 2001, until Pat Fallon won election in 2018. Wichita Falls is part of Texas's 13th congressional district for the U.S. House of Representatives. Ronny Jackson, a Republican, has held this seat since 2021. The 13th District is considered the most conservative district in the country, according to the Cook Political Report 2018.

The prison is named for former Governor James V. Allred, a Democrat and a native of Bowie, Texas, who lived early in his career in Wichita Falls. The United States Postal Service operates the Wichita Falls Post Office, the Morningside Post Office, the Bridge Creek Post Office, and the Sheppard Air Force Base Post Office.

Education

Primary and secondary schools
Public primary and secondary education is covered by the following school districts: Wichita Falls Independent School District, City View Independent School District, Burkburnett Independent School District, and Iowa Park Consolidated Independent School District. Several private and parochial schools operate in the city, as does an active home-school community. Many of the local elementary schools participate in the Head Start program for preschool-aged children.

Two schools in the Wichita Falls ISD participate in the International Baccalaureate programs. Hirschi High School offers the IB Diploma Programme, and G.H. Kirby Junior High School for the Middle Years Programme. Other public high schools are Wichita Falls High School and S. H. Rider High School (Wichita Falls ISD) and City View High School (City View ISD).

By 1879 the first school was established. The first public school was a log cabin structure established in the 1880s; in 1885 it was replaced with a former courthouse. Wichita Falls High School opened in 1890. That year a school district was created, but problems with the law allowing its establishment meant it was dissolved in 1894 and the city provided schooling until the second establishment of a school district in 1900. In 1908 the Texas Legislature issued a charter for WFISD.

There is a school for German children, Deutsche Schule Sheppard (DSS).

Higher education

Wichita Falls is home to Midwestern State University, an accredited four-year college in the Texas Tech University System and the only independent liberal arts college in Texas offering both bachelor's and master's degrees.

Vernon College is the designated community college for all of Wichita County. A local branch nearby offers two-year degrees, certificate programs, and workforce development programs

Wayland Baptist University, offering both bachelor's and master's degrees, has its main branch located in Plainview, Texas.

Transportation

Highways
Wichita Falls is the western terminus for Interstate 44. U.S. Highways leading to or through Wichita Falls include 287, 277, 281, and 82. State Highway 240 ends at Wichita Falls and State Highway 79 runs through it. Wichita Falls has one of the largest freeway mileages for a city of its size as a result of a 1954 bond issue approved by city and county voters to purchase rights-of-way for several expressway routes through the city and county, the first of which was opened in the year 1958 as an alignment of U.S. 287 from Eighth Street at Broad and Holliday Streets northwestward across the Wichita River and bisecting Lucy and Scotland Parks to the Old Iowa Park Road, the original U.S. 287 alignment. That was followed by other expressway links including U.S. 82–287 east to Henrietta (completed in the year 1968), U.S. 281 south toward Jacksboro (completed 1969), U.S. 287 northwest to Iowa Park and Electra (opened 1962), Interstate 44 north to Burkburnett and the Red River (opened 1964), and Interstate 44 from Old Iowa Park Road to U.S. 287/Spur 325 interchange on the city's north side along with Spur 325 from I-44/U.S. 287 to the main gate of Sheppard Air Force Base (both completed as a single project in 1960). However, cross-country traffic for many years had to contend with several ground-level intersections and traffic lights over Holliday and Broad Streets near the downtown area for about 13 blocks between connecting expressway links until a new elevated freeway running overhead was completed in 2001.

Efforts to create an additional freeway along the path of Kell Boulevard for U.S. 82–277 began in 1967 with the acquisition of right-of-way that included a former railroad right-of-way and the first project including construction of the present frontage roads completed in 1977, followed by freeway lanes, overpasses, and on/off ramps in 1989 from just east of Brook Avenue west to Kemp Boulevard; similar projects west from Kemp to Barnett Road in 2001 followed by Barnett Road west past FM 369 in 2010 to tie in which a project now underway to transform U.S. 277 into a continuous four-lane expressway between Wichita Falls and Abilene.

Public transportation

The city operates a bus system, Falls Ride, which runs on an hourly schedule with seven routes (except on Sundays, when only one route is in operation).

Greyhound Lines provides intercity bus service to other locations served by Greyhound via its new terminal at the Wichita Falls Travel Center located at Fourth and Scott in downtown. Skylark Van Service shuttles passengers to and from Dallas-Fort Worth International Airport on several runs during the day all week long.

The Wichita Falls Municipal Airport is served by American Eagle, with four flights daily to the Dallas/Fort Worth International Airport. The Kickapoo Downtown Airport and the Wichita Valley Airport serve smaller, private planes.

Landmarks

Notable people
Chase Anderson, professional baseball player (born in Wichita Falls and graduated from S. H. Rider High School).
 Greg Abbott, 48th Governor of Texas, first term began January 20, 2015 (born in Wichita Falls).
 JT Barrett, quarterback for Ohio State University, born in Wichita Falls and graduated from Rider in 2013
 Lindy Berry, MVP quarterback with the Edmonton Eskimos in Canadian Football League. 
 Ryan Brasier, baseball player (born in Wichita Falls and graduated from S. H. Rider High School).
 John Bundy, magician
 Raymond Carroll, renowned statistician now at Texas A&M University (born in Yokohama, Kanagawa, Japan, grew up in Wichita Falls).
 Frank Kell Cahoon, Midland oilman and member of Texas House of Representatives; grandson of Frank Kell (born in Austin, Texas, grew up in Wichita Falls).
 Greyson Chance, singer-songwriter and pianist (born in Wichita Falls and grew up in Edmond, Oklahoma).
 Don Cherry, charting pop singer and leading amateur golfer of 1950s and early '60s (born in Wichita Falls, died in Las Vegas, Nevada).
 Bert Clark, football coach, former head coach at Washington State University (born in Wichita Falls, died in Katy, Texas).
 Phyllis Coates, film and television actress who originated role of Lois Lane in first 26 episodes of Adventures of Superman (born in Wichita Falls, currently lives in Los Angeles, California).
 William C. Conner (1920–2009), federal judge for United States District Court for the Southern District of New York (born in Wichita Falls, died in Bronxville, New York).
 Hunter Dozier Professional Baseball Player for the Kansas City Royals
 Nic Endo, singer for digital-hardcore band Atari Teenage Riot
 "Cowboy" Morgan Evans, rodeo champion
 Sally Gary, speaker and author
 Mia Hamm, NCAA, World Cup, and Olympic champion soccer player, attended Notre Dame Catholic School in Wichita Falls
 Roberta Haynes, actress
 Eddie Hill, drag racer
 Frank N. Ikard, U.S. representative from Texas's 13th congressional district from 1951 to 1961; oil industry lobbyist
 Robert Jeffress, Baptist clergyman
 Neel Kearby, World War II US Army Air Forces flying ace and Medal of Honor recipient
 Keith Lee, professional Wrestler
 Khari Long, professional football player
 Rosie Manning, professional football player
 Markelle Martin, professional football player
 Phil McGraw, advice television show host
 Ed Neal, professional football player
 David Nelson, professional football player
 Edward Opp, photojournalist
 Don Owen, Louisiana news anchor and politician from Shreveport, Louisiana, got his start at KFDX-TV in Wichita Falls in 1953. 
 Graham B. Purcell, Jr., Democrat, U.S. representative 1962–1973; post office on Lamar Street in downtown Wichita Falls is named in his honor
 Frances Reid, soap opera actress
 Mark Rippetoe, physical trainer and author, competitive powerlifter, gym owner
 Herbert Rogers, classical pianist
 Lloyd Ruby, race car driver
 Bernard Scott, professional football player
 Frank Lee Sprague, composer and musician
 Keith Stegall, country music artist and record producer
 David Swinford, Texas state legislator
 Rex Tillerson, 69th United States Secretary of State, former ExxonMobil CEO
 John Tower, U.S. Senator from 1961 to 1984
 Tommy Tune, actor, dancer, choreographer and producer, 10-time Tony Award winner
 Nathan Vasher, professional football player
 John Edward Williams, Author of the novel Stoner. 
 Ronnie Williams, professional football player
 Dave Willis, voice actor, screenwriter, television producer
 Shaunie O’Neal, American television personality

See also

List of museums in Wichita Falls, Texas
Geology of Wichita Falls, Texas

Notes

References

Bibliography

External links

 
1876 establishments in Texas
Cities in Wichita County, Texas
County seats in Texas
.
Populated riverside places in the United States
Cities in Texas